Landgrave was a noble title used in the Holy Roman Empire, and later on in its former territories.

Etymology
The English word landgrave is the equivalent of the German Landgraf, a compound of the words Land and Graf (German: Count).

Description
The title referred originally to a count who had imperial immediacy, or feudal duty owed directly to the Holy Roman Emperor. His jurisdiction stretched over a sometimes quite considerable territory, which was not subservient to an intermediate power, such as a duke, a bishop or count palatine. The title survived from the times of the Holy Roman Empire (first recorded in Lower Lotharingia from 1086: Henry III, Count of Louvain, as landgrave of Brabant). By definition, a landgrave exercised sovereign rights. His decision-making power was comparable to that of a Duke.

Landgrave occasionally continued in use as the subsidiary title of such noblemen as the Grand Duke of Saxe-Weimar, who functioned as the Landgrave of Thuringia in the first decade of the 20th century, but the title fell into disuse after World War II.

The jurisdiction of a landgrave was a landgraviate, and the wife of a landgrave or a female landgrave was known as a landgravine (from the German ,  being the feminine form of )

The term was also used in the Carolinas (what is now North and South Carolina in the United States) during British rule. A "landgrave" was "a county nobleman in the British, privately held North American colony Carolina, ranking just below the proprietary (chartered equivalent of a royal vassal)."

Examples
Examples include:
 Landgraves of Thuringia
 Landgraves of Hesse and its subsequent divisions (Hesse-Kassel, -Darmstadt, -Rotenburg, -Philippsthal(-Barchfeld), -Rheinfels, -Homburg(-Bingenheim), -Marburg).
 Landgraves of Leuchtenberg, situated around a Bavarian castle (later raised into a duchy)
 Landgraves of Stühlingen
 Landgraves of Klettgau
 Fürstenberg-Weitra
 Fürstenberg-Taikowitz
 Landgraviate of Alsace
 Upper Alsace
 Lower Alsace

Related terms
 Landgraviate – the rank, office, or territory held by a landgrave
 Landgravine – the wife of a landgrave or one who exercises the office or holds the rank in her own right.

References

Further reading
 Mayer, Theodor, "Über Entstehung und Bedeutung der älteren deutschen Landgrafschaften", in Mitteralterliche Studien – Gesammelte Aufsätze, ed. F. Knapp (Sigmaringen 1958) 187–201. Also published in Zeitschrift der Savigny-Stiftung für Rechtsgeschichte, Germanische Abteilung 58 (1938) 210–288.
 Mayer, Theodor, 'Herzogtum und Landeshoheit', Fürsten und Staat. Studien zur Verfassungsgeschichte des deutschen Mittelalters (Weimar 1950) 276–301.
 Eichenberger, T., Patria: Studien zur Bedeutung des Wortes im Mittelalter (6.-12. Jahrhundert), Nationes – Historische und philologische Untersuchungen zur Entstehung der europäischen Nationen im Mittelalter 9 (Sigmaringen 1991).
 Van Droogenbroeck, Frans J., 'De betekenis van paltsgraaf Herman II (1064-1085) voor het graafschap Brabant', Eigen Schoon en De Brabander, 87 (2004), 1-166.
 Van Droogenbroeck, Frans J., Het landgraafschap Brabant (1085-1183) en zijn paltsgrafelijke voorgeschiedenis. De territoriale en institutionele aanloop tot het ontstaan van het hertogdom Brabant (2004)

External links
 

German noble titles
Heads of state
Noble titles